Greg Bird may refer to:
Greg Bird (rugby league) (born 1984), Australian rugby league player
Greg Bird (baseball) (born 1992), American baseball player